"We're All in This Together" is a song from the Disney Channel Original Movie High School Musical and appears on the soundtrack of the same name. It features vocals from the cast of the movie including Vanessa Hudgens, Ashley Tisdale, Lucas Grabeel, and Drew Seeley, who sings for Zac Efron's character Troy Bolton. It was written by Matthew Gerrard and Robbie Nevil, with production credited Gerrard, and executively produced by Kenny Ortega, Bill Borden, and Barry Rosenbush. The song uses elements to simulate a school pep rally, such as a whistle and school band instruments. It also features a dance in the chorus iconic to the scene in the original movie. The song was released as the second single from the soundtrack on October 16, 2006 and is considered a signature song from the franchise.

Composition 
The song has a length of 3:51, has a tempo of 116, and is in the key of C# Major. The song describes coming together despite their being differences between each other. It's used in the film during the finale number, where the whole cast comes together in the East High school's gymnasium to celebrate Troy Bolton scoring the winning point during the school's basketball championship. Certain cast members have solos throughout the song, with Seeley as Bolton having the first, Hudgens taking second, Grabeel taking third, Tisdale taking fourth, and the cast singing together for the songs main chorus and ending Wildcat's chant.

Music video 
A music video was released alongside the film for promotion on Disney Channel. The music video takes the scene from the movie where the song is performed, showing the whole ensemble dance with balloons on the floor and the audience engaging. It was also released with the special features on the DVD edition of the movie on May 26, 2006.

Other versions 
"We're All In This Together" has been covered several times in the film's other franchise installments. A remix version of the song was released with the 2-disc Special Edition of the film titled, The Remix Edition on December 5, 2006. A music video was included in the special edition which features behind-the-scenes footage from the movie and footage of the cast recording the song in a studio. The "Celebration Mix" was included in the third installment of the franchise's soundtrack on October 22, 2008. The cast for the Disney+ series High School Musical: The Musical: The Series covered the song during the season one finale and is included in the soundtrack.

The cast of the original film reunited during ABC Family's Disney Family Singalong on April 16, 2020 to sing together. It was used in the special to, "strengthen [the] spirits for those joining us for the broadcast", in response to the COVID-19 pandemic in 2020.

Charts

Certifications

Release history

References 

Songs from High School Musical (franchise)